Katherine Downes (born 11 June 1982) is an English television presenter who works on the BBC News Channel and BBC Breakfast, specialising in sports coverage.

Biography
She went to the independent St Peter's School, York. She studied journalism at Cardiff University.

In 2009, Downes was working at BBC South East for which she won Best Newcomer at the Royal Television Society Southern Centre Awards in 2010.

Downes joined the BBC Sport team in 2012 when it moved to Salford. She had previously worked as a reporter and occasional presenter on BBC South East Today, as well as reporting on a variety of news stories as a correspondent for BBC Breakfast and the BBC News Channel during 2011.

On 1 June 2013, she married Tim Sleap at All Hallows Church in Sutton-on-the-Forest near York. She had allowed readers of Brides magazine to choose her wedding dress from a selection of five.

In 2022, Downes was part of BBC Sport's presentation and interview team at the Commonwealth Games in Birmingham.

References

1982 births
Living people
Alumni of Cardiff University
BBC newsreaders and journalists
British women television journalists
English sports broadcasters
English sports journalists
English television journalists
English television presenters
English women journalists
People educated at St Peter's School, York
British radio presenters
British women radio presenters